Juan Carlos Mignone Crisera (born 14 November 1961) is an Uruguayan former basketball player who competed in the 1984 Summer Olympics.

References

External links

1961 births
Living people
Uruguayan men's basketball players
Olympic basketball players of Uruguay
Basketball players at the 1984 Summer Olympics
Basketball players at the 1987 Pan American Games
Pan American Games competitors for Uruguay